In baseball, a triple is recorded when the ball is hit so that the batter is able to advance all the way to third base, scoring any runners who were already on base, with no errors by the defensive team on the play. In Major League Baseball (MLB), a player in each league  is recognized for leading the league in triples. Only triples hit in a particular league count toward that league's seasonal lead.

The first triples champion in the National League was Ross Barnes; in the league's inaugural 1876 season, Barnes hit fourteen triples for the Chicago White Stockings. In 1901, the American League was established and led by two members of the Baltimore Orioles: Bill Keister and Jimmy Williams each had 21. Sam Crawford and Turkey Stearnes each led their respective leagues (the American League and Negro league baseball) six times, which is the most for any player.

American League

National League

American Association

Federal League

Player's League

Union Association

Footnotes
Recognized "major leagues" include the current American and National Leagues and several defunct leagues – the American Association, the Federal League, the Players' League, and the Union Association.

References

Baseball-Reference

Triples champions
Triples